The 2022–2023 Bikarkeppni kvenna, named VÍS bikarinn for sponsorship reasons, was the 49th edition of the Icelandic Women's Basketball Cup, won by Haukar against Keflavík. The competition was managed by the Icelandic Basketball Association (KKÍ) and the cup final was played in Laugardalshöll, Reykjavík, and broadcast live on RÚV. Sólrún Inga Gísladóttir was named the Cup Finals MVP after turning in 20 points, 7 rebounds and 7 assists.

Participating teams
16 teams signed up for the Cup tournament.

Final four

Cup Finals MVP

References

External links
2022–2023 Tournament results

Women's Cup